Tommy Dorsey's Dance Party is a 1966 jazz album featuring Tommy Dorsey and various other artists.

Track listing

Side one

Side two

References

External links
 

Tommy Dorsey albums